Ian Bateman OBE US-NAS FBA FEAERE FRSA FRSB (born 1961) is a Professor of Environmental Economics at the Land, Environment, Economics and Policy (LEEP) Institute at the University of Exeter.  He is Chief Editor of the journal "Environmental and Resource Economics". He was formerly a member of the Natural Capital Committee, a member of the Defra Science Advisory Council, and Director of the Centre for Social and Economic Research on the Global Environment (CSERGE).

He was educated at Handsworth Grammar School, the University of Birmingham (BSc), the University of Manchester (MA), and the University of Nottingham (PhD). He was the Principal Investigator of the ESRC Large Grant: Social, Economic and Environmental Research (SEER) and of the  NERC Valuing Nature Network (VNN).  He is also Adjunct Professor of Agricultural and Resource Economics, University of Western Australia, Perth and Adjunct Professor in the Department of Economics in both the University of Waikato Management School, New Zealand and at Lincoln University, New Zealand.  He was Head of Economics for the UK National Ecosystem Assessment from 2009-2011.

Honours / awards
Ian Bateman was appointed an OBE for services to environmental science and policy 2013 and he also received the Royal Society Wolfson Research Merit Award for 2011-2016.

Publications
 Economic analysis for the UK national ecosystem assessment: synthesis and scenario valuation of changes in ecosystem services, 2014
 Using revealed preferences to estimate the Value of Travel Time to recreation sites, 2014   
 The importance of local forest benefits: Economic valuation of Non-Timber Forest Products in the Eastern Arc Mountains in Tanzania, 2013 
 Sustainable intensification in agriculture: premises and policies, 2013 
 A synthesis of approaches to assess and value ecosystem services in the EU in the context of TEEB, 2013

References
 Professor Ian Bateman OBE
 Professor Ian J. Bateman
 Valuing Nature Network
 Natural Capital Committee 
 UK Energy Research Centre

Notes

1961 births
Living people
People educated at Handsworth Grammar School
Alumni of the University of Birmingham
Alumni of the University of Manchester
Alumni of the University of Nottingham
Academics of the University of East Anglia
Officers of the Order of the British Empire
British economists
Foreign associates of the National Academy of Sciences